Mohammad Faisal is a Pakistani diplomat who was the spokesperson for the Ministry of Foreign Affairs, and he remained in office from 2017 to 2019. He has also served as the Director General of the SA and SAARC. Dr Faisal is now Ambassador of Pakistan to Germany

Personal life and education
He received a MBBS degree from Rawalpindi Medical College. He completed his LL.M. from University of Warwick and Masters in WTO Law from Brussels. Faisal is married to Sarah Naeem, a leading dermatologist of Islamabad and they have three children, Seyreen, Romaan and Ahmad

Career 
Faisal has worked with Foreign Service of Pakistan for more than 25 years. On 27 October 2017, he was appointed as Foreign Office spokesperson. Faisal is now Ambassador of Pakistan to Germany.

References 

Pakistani diplomats
Year of birth missing (living people)
Living people